John Work may refer to:
 John Work (fur trader) (1792–1861), chief factor in Hudson's Bay Company and member of a founding family of Victoria, British Columbia
 John M. Work (1869–1961), American socialist and newspaper editor
 John Wesley Work Jr. (1871–1925), American song collector and choral director
 John Wesley Work III (1901–1967), American composer and scholar
 John Work House and Mill Site, a historic gristmill in Charlestown, Indiana

See also
 John Work Garrett (1820–1884), American banker and railroad executive
 John Work Scott (1807–1879), president of Washington College

Work, John